Tashly (Taşlı) is a rural locality (a selo) and the administrative center of Tashlinsky Selsoviet, Alsheyevsky District, Bashkortostan, Russia. The population was 454 as of 2010. There are 8 streets.

Geography 
Tashly is located 27 km northwest of Rayevsky (the district's administrative centre) by road. Tashtyube is the nearest rural locality.

References 

Rural localities in Alsheyevsky District